The Spanish Communist Workers' Party (Partido Comunista Obrero Español) was a communist party founded on April 13, 1921 by the terceristas, including Virginia González Polo, Daniel Anguiano, Eduardo Torralba Beci, Manuel Núñez Arenas, Luis Mancebo and Evaristo Gil, who had been trying to persuade the Spanish Socialist Workers' Party (PSOE) to join the Third International. When the PSOE Congress voted to join the Vienna International and refused Bolshevism, the terceristas broke away.

A new Communist Party of Spain was founded on November 14, 1921 through an act of merger of Partido Comunista Español and Partido Comunista Obrero Español. The unified PCE soon adhered to the Comintern.

References

Political parties established in 1921
Communist parties in Spain
1921 establishments in Spain
Political parties disestablished in 1921
Defunct political parties in Spain
1921 disestablishments in Spain